Picture a Hum Can't Hear a Sound is the debut album by Australian rock band 78 Saab, released in 2000.

Recording of the album followed their collaboration with Powderfinger producer Tim Whitten for the single "Sunshine", which  won heavy rotation on the Triple J radio network. 
Indie guitar producer Greg Wales was called in to record their debut album, which songwriter Ben Nash described as a mixed tapestry of rural and urban imagery. "The album came together in its own time," he said. "So many bands rush to get that first album out, then peter off and fall away. We love the idea of the classic album."

The Age described the album as "the type of melodic, guitar-based pop that commercial radio programmers just don't want to know about" and praised the inclusion of "Sunshine" which it described as an "ethereal chunk of psychedelia". It said: "Producer Greg Wales, best known for his work with Melbourne's Snout, gives it all a healthy sonic sheen, preserving the band's full throttle approach while enhancing the material's melodic strengths."

Track listing
(all songs by Ben Nash and 78 Saab)
 "Iris-Ann" — 1:03
 "Smile" — 3:30
 "Sunshine" — 5:13
 "Karma Package Deal" — 3:57
 "Tetanus" — 5:11
 "Jack Frost"  — 3:36
 "Don't Know Much" — 5:16
 "Green Moon Rise" — 3:16
 "Left It Up To You" — 3:44
 "Doctor" — 4:25
 "Never Ending" — 5:04
 "Soda" — 7:41
 "Iris-Ann (reprise)" — 0:56

Personnel
 Jake Andrews — guitars
 Nicholai Danko — drums
 Ben Nash — vocals, guitar
 Garth Tregillgas (credited as G. Surls) — bass, guitar, vocals

Additional personnel 
 Robert F. Cranny — keyboards, vocals
 Greg Wales — percussion
 Tim Whitten — synthesizer ("Sunshine")
 Lauren Friedman — vocals ("Don't Know Much")

References

2000 debut albums
78 Saab albums
Ivy League Records albums